Mutua is a Kenyan surname that may refer to the following people:
Alfred Mutua (born 1970), Kenyan Government Spokesperson 
 Ben Mutua Jonathan Muriithi (born 1969), Kenyan writer and actor based in the United States
David Mutinda Mutua (born 1992), Kenyan middle-distance runner
 Joseph Mutua (born 1978), Kenyan middle-distance runner 
Kasiva Mutua, Kenyan drummer
Makau W. Mutua (born 1958), Kenyan-American professor of law